Pfister & Vogel (P&V) was an American tannery business in Milwaukee, Wisconsin.

Frederick Vogel emigrated from Wurtemberg, Germany to Milwaukee. In 1848, he founded a tannery on Milwaukee's Menominee River. Having also emigrated from Wurtemberg in 1845, Vogel's cousin Guido Pfister opened a shoe store on nearby West Water Street. They joined forces as the Pfister & Vogel Leather Company in 1853, and their company thrived, becoming one of the largest leather producers in the country.  August H. Vogel was vice-president of the company until his death.

The company changed hands several times. Its last owners, U.S. Leather Company, shut it down in 2000. 

The original Pfister & Vogel campus on Water Street in Downtown Milwaukee was demolished and the site cleaned and prepared for development in 2007. Between 2008 and 2017, Milwaukee based developer Mandel Group constructed a four phase mixed-used development on the grounds. The North End consists of six apartment buildings, a Fresh Thyme grocery store and other retail tenants. The complex contains 673 apartments.

See also
Charles F. Pfister  
A.L. Gebhardt & Co.
Vogel State Park
Fred R. Zimmerman 
Menomonee Valley
Mandel Group

References

External links
Personalized Leather Goods

1853 establishments in Wisconsin
2000 disestablishments in Wisconsin
Manufacturing companies disestablished in 2000
Manufacturing companies established in 1853
Defunct manufacturing companies based in Milwaukee
Defunct leather manufacturers
Tanneries